Albonese (Lombard: Albunes) is a comune (municipality) in the Province of Pavia in the Italian region Lombardy, located about 40 km southwest of Milan and about 40 km northwest of Pavia.

Albonese borders the following municipalities: Borgolavezzaro, Cilavegna, Mortara, Nicorvo, Parona.

References 

Cities and towns in Lombardy
Articles which contain graphical timelines